Amphissa is a genus of small sea snails, marine gastropod mollusks in the family Columbellidae, the dove snails.

Species
Species within the genus Amphissa include:
 Amphissa acutecostata
 Amphissa columbiana
 Amphissa versicolor

References

Columbellidae